The Government Commission for Higher Education (often known as the Stjernø Commission) was a commission appointed by the Government of Norway in 2006 to present recommendations on the development of research and higher education in Norway in a 20-year perspective. The Commission presented its report, Norwegian Official Report 2008:3, in 2008. The report proposed, inter alia, to reduce the number of universities and colleges in Norway to eight or ten.

Members
The Commission consisted of the following members
Steinar Stjernø
Irene Dahl Andersen
Marianne Andreassen
Peter Arbo
Agneta Bladh
Kirsti Kolle Grøndahl
Marianne Harg
Peter Maassen
Jens Maseng
Ernst Nordtveit
Kathrine Skretting
Katrine Elida Aaland

References

External links
 Norwegian Official Report 2008:3

Politics of Norway